Neozatrephes is a genus of moths in the family Erebidae. The genus was erected by Herbert Druce in 1893.

Species
 Neozatrephes schausi Rothschild, 1909
 Neozatrephes telesilla H. Druce, 1893

References

External links

 Neozatrephes at the Biodiversity Heritage Library

Phaegopterina
Moth genera